Heung Chung is a village in the Hebe Haven area of Sai Kung District, Hong Kong.

Administration
Heung Chung is a recognized village under the New Territories Small House Policy.

History
At the time of the 1911 census, the population of Shek Kwu Lung was 4. The number of males was 1.

References

Villages in Sai Kung District, Hong Kong